Avadhūta (IAST , written as अवधूत) is a Sanskrit term from the root 'to shake' (see V. S. Apte and Monier-Williams) that, among its many uses, in some Indian religions indicates a type of mystic or saint who is beyond egoic-consciousness, duality and common worldly concerns and acts without consideration for standard social etiquette. Avadhūta is a Jivanmukta who gives his insight to others and teaches them about his realisation of the true nature of the ultimate reality (Brahman) and self (Ātman) and takes the role of a guru to show the path of moksha to others. Some Avadhūta also achieve the title of Paramahamsa.

Similar figures (colloquially called 'mad/crazy monks') are also known in Buddhist traditions, such as the medieval Zen monk Ikkyū, and the 20th century Tibetan tulku Chögyam Trungpa Rinpoche. In Tibetan Buddhism the equivalent type is called a nyönpa.

Types of avadhūtas
Feuerstein (1991: p. 105) frames how the term avadhūta came to be associated with the mad or eccentric holiness or 'crazy wisdom' of some antinomian paramahamsa who were often 'skyclad' or 'naked' (Sanskrit: digambara):

Sacrifice
Sarat Chandra Das et al.. (1902: p. 20) equates Chöd practitioners as a type of avadhūta:

The rites of Chöd differ between lineages but essentially there is an offering of their body as food, a blessing to demons and other entities to whom this kind of offering may be of benefit, the ganachakra. This leitmotif and sādhanā is common to another denizen of the charnel ground, Dattātreya the avadhūta, to whom has been attributed the esteemed non-dual medieval song, the Avadhūta Gītā. Dattātreya was a founding guru (ādiguru) of the Aghori according to Barrett (2008: p. 33):

Mahānirvāṇatantram
John Woodroffe, in his translation of the Mahānirvāṇatantraṃ from the original Sanskrit into English under the pen name "Arthur Avalon", may be the opening discourse of the archetype of "avadhūta" to the English reading public, as none of the avadhūta upanishads were translated amongst the collections of minor upanishads such as the Thirty Minor Upanishads (Aiyar: 1914). The Mahānirvāṇatantraṃ is an example of a nondualist tantra and the translation of this work had a profound impact on the Indologists of the early to mid 20th century. The work is notable for many reasons and importantly mentions four kinds of avadhūta.

Brahmanirvāṇatantram
The Brahmanirvantantra describes how to identify the avadhuts of the following types:
 Brahmāvadhūta : An avadhuta from birth who appears in any class of society. Completely indifferent to the world or worldly matters.
 Shaivāvadhūta : Avadhutas who have taken to the renounced order of life (sannyasa), often with unkempt long hair (jata), or who dress in the manner of Shaivites and spend almost all of their time in trance (samadhi), or meditation.
 Vīrāvadhūta : This person looks like a sadhu who has put red colored sandal paste on his body and wears saffron clothes. His hair is very well grown and is normally furling in the wind. They wear in their neck Hindu prayer beads made of Rudraksha or a string with bones. They hold a wooden stick in their hand and additionally they always have a parashu (ritual ax) or damaru (small drum) with them.
 Kulāvadhūta : These people are supposed to have taken initiation from the Kaula sampradaya or people who awakened their Kundalini and capable of merging it at Sahasrāra Chakra or people who are capable of raising their awareness to Turiya and Turiyatita states. They are adepts in Kundalini Tantra. It is very difficult to recognize these people as they do not wear any signs outside which can identify them from others. The speciality of these people is that they remain and live like usual people do. They can show themselves in the form of Kings, a warrior, a family man or a beggar. That is, a Kulavadhuta shows no outside signs of their spiritual status.

Relationship with the Nath sampradaya
The Nath sampradaya is a form of avadhūta panthan. In this sampradaya, Guru and yoga are of extreme importance. The important book for the Nath is the Avadhuta Gita. Gorakshanath is considered the topmost form of the avadhuta-state.

Books
 Siddha Siddhanta Paddhati is a very early extant hatha yoga Sanskrit text attributed to Gorakshanath by the indigenous tradition, as Georg Feuerstein (1991: p. 105) relates:

 Jayachamarajendra Wadiyar's Avadhoota: Reason & Reverence, Indian Institute of World Culture, Bangalore, 1958.
 The Avadhūtaka Upaniṣad is the 79th book of the Muktikā canon of Upaniṣads. It is a sannyāsa upaniṣad associated with the Black Yajurveda (कृष्णयजुर्वेद).
 According to the International Nath Order of the Nath sampradāya, the Avadhūta Gītā is a text of Advaita Vedānta sung by Dattātreya and recorded by his disciples Svāmī and Kārtika.

See also
 Nityananda
 Mast (Sufism)

Notes

External links
 Avadhut Gita by Dattatreya
 'Avadhut' (April, 2008) by the International Nath Order
 avadhūta Gita Translation available as mp3 audio

Hindu asceticism
Buddhist asceticism